Amlodipine/valsartan, sold under the brand name Exforge among others, is a blood pressure lowering combination drug. It contains amlodipine, as the besilate, a dihydropyridine-type calcium channel blocker, and valsartan, an angiotensin II receptor antagonist. This combination is usually well tolerated and effective for the reduction of blood pressure.

The combination was approved for medical use in the United States in June 2007.

The combination is also available with included hydrochlorothiazide (Exforge HCT), for people who need a three-drug regimen to manage their blood pressure. It was approved for medical use in the United States in April 2009.

References

External links
 
 

Calcium channel blockers
Angiotensin II receptor antagonists
Combination drugs
Novartis brands